Storsteinnes is the administrative center of Balsfjord Municipality in Troms og Finnmark county, Norway. This makes it the largest urban area in the municipality. Storsteinnes Chapel is located in this village.

Location
Storsteinnes is located at the southern end of the Sørkjosen, which is a branch of the main Balsfjorden.

Economy
Most of the economy of Storsteinnes involves municipal services, but agriculture is also important. Tine runs a dairy in Storsteinnes, which is one of Norway's largest producers of Brunost.  They also produce a special kind of goat milk cheese called Balsfjordost.

References

Villages in Troms
Populated places of Arctic Norway
Balsfjord